is located in Hakone, Kanagawa Prefecture, Japan. It opened in September 2002 within Fuji-Hakone-Izu National Park. It houses the collection of over 9,500 works acquired by the former head of the Pola cosmetics group, including many works of French Impressionism and of the École de Paris. The striking building is by Nikken Sekkei.
The museum added the "Pola Museum of Art Nature Trail" in 2013, a 670 meter long hiking trail along the museum grounds intended for museum guests to enjoy the scenery at Fuji-Hakone-Izu National Park.

Collection

See also
 Gōra Station
 Hakone Open-Air Museum
 Hakone Botanical Garden of Wetlands

References

External links

 Homepage

Museums in Kanagawa Prefecture
Art museums and galleries in Japan
Buildings and structures in Hakone, Kanagawa
Art museums established in 2002
2002 establishments in Japan